The Lawrenceville Stories (also known as The Prodigious Hickey) is a 1987–1989  miniseries, directed by Allan A. Goldstein and Robert Iscove, based on The Lawrenceville Stories written by Owen Johnson. The series was originally broadcast as episodes of the American Playhouse anthology television series on Public Broadcasting Service starting on January 26, 1987 (Season 6, Episode 2). It follows the adventures of school prankster Hickey (Zach Galligan)  and his rival, The Tennessee Shad (Nicholas Rowe).

Plot
Lawrenceville prankster Hickey pulls one prank too many and is expelled from school. When he returns he finds that there's a new joker in town, The Tennessee Shad, and although they initially are rivals, they soon realize that together they can cause more trouble, so they establish a partnership that they call "The Firm".

Cast

 Zach Galligan as William "Hickey" Hicks
 Nicholas Rowe as The Tennessee Shad
 Edward Herrmann as The Headmaster
 Stephen Baldwin as GutterPup
 Josh Hamilton as Lovely
 Robert Joy as Housemaster Tapping
 Dave Foley as Smith

Episodes

References

External links
 
 American Playhouse: The Lawrenceville Stories: The Prodigious Hickey (TV)
 American Playhouse: The Lawrenceville Stories: The Return of Hickey (TV)
 American Playhouse: The Lawrenceville Stories: The Beginning of the Firm (TV)

1987 Canadian television series debuts
1989 Canadian television series endings
1980s Canadian television miniseries
English-language television shows
Television series set in the 1900s
Television shows based on American novels